Javanese is a Unicode block containing aksara Jawa characters traditionally used for writing the Javanese language.

Block
The Unicode block for Javanese is U+A980–U+A9DF. There are 91 code points for Javanese script: 53 letters, 19 punctuation marks, 10 numbers, and 9 vowels:

History
The following Unicode-related documents record the purpose and process of defining specific characters in the Javanese block:

See also 
 Balinese (Unicode block)
 Sundanese (Unicode block)

References 

Unicode blocks
Javanese language
Javanese script